Tunitas Creek is a  stream in San Mateo County, California. Tunitas is Spanish for "little prickly pears".

History
The first European land exploration of Alta California, the Spanish Portolà expedition, traveled along the coast on its way north, camping for three days near today's San Gregorio, October 24–26, 1769. On the return journey to San Diego, the party camped near Half Moon Bay on November 16, and at Tunitas Creek on November 17. Franciscan missionary Juan Crespi noted in his diary, "This morning broke very cloudy, and as soon as we started on our way it began to rain, and in the whole three leagues (about ) that we traveled it was falling on us. We halted on the banks of a deep arroyo."

The name "Arroyo de Las Tunitas" appears on the diseños (claim maps) of both Rancho San Gregorio (1839) and Rancho Cañada Verde (1838) because it was part of the boundary between them.

The cliffs just north of the Tunitas Creek outflow were the site of "Gordon's Chute", a ramp for sliding farm goods from the top of the cliffs to ships anchored in the rolling surf below. Gordon's Chute, named for its builder, local resident Alexander Gordon, was constructed in 1872 and lasted until 1885, when a storm blew it away. Eyebolts for the chute can still be found in the cliff-face.

Tributaries
Dry Creek
Rings Gulch
East Fork Tunitas Creek
Mitchell Creek

See also
List of watercourses in the San Francisco Bay Area

References

External links
Access to Tunitas Beach

Rivers of San Mateo County, California
Rivers of Northern California